The 1982 Swiss Indoors was a men's tennis tournament played on indoor hard courts at the St. Jakobshalle in Basel, Switzerland that was part of the 1982 Volvo Grand Prix. It was the 14th edition of the tournament and was held from 11 October through 17 October 1982. First-seeded Yannick Noah won the singles title.

Finals

Singles
 Yannick Noah defeated  Mats Wilander 6–4, 6–2, 6–3
 It was Noah's 3rd singles title of the year and the 10th of his career.

Doubles
 Henri Leconte /  Yannick Noah defeated  Fritz Buehning /  Pavel Složil 6–2, 6–2

References

External links
 Official website 
 ITF tournament edition details

Swiss Indoors
Swiss Indoors
1982 in Swiss tennis